Jiaxing Vincent Abbey is a Roman Catholic Church in Nanhu District, Jiaxing, Zhejiang, China.

History
Jiaxing Vincent Abbey was built by French priest Bu Shijia in 1903, during the Guangxu period of the Qing dynasty (1644–1911). After the establishment of the Communist State in 1949, the church put an end to religious activities. During the Cultural Revolution, the Red Guards attacked the church and Catholic books were damaged or destroyed. In March 2005, it was designated as a "Historical and Cultural Site Protected at the Provincial Level" by the Zhejiang government. In May 2013, it was listed among the seventh batch of "Major National Historical and Cultural Sites in Zhejiang" alongside Jiaxing Catholic Church by the State Council of China.

References

Further reading
 
 

Churches in Zhejiang
Tourist attractions in Jiaxing
Roman Catholic churches in China
1903 establishments in China
20th-century Roman Catholic church buildings in China
Roman Catholic churches completed in 1903
Major National Historical and Cultural Sites in Zhejiang